Gaspé is a provincial electoral district in the Gaspésie–Îles-de-la-Madeleine region of Quebec, Canada, which elects members to the National Assembly of Quebec.  It is located on the eastern edge of the Gaspé Peninsula. It notably includes the municipalities of Gaspé, Sainte-Anne-des-Monts, Grande-Rivière and Percé.

It was originally created for the 1867 election (and an electoral district of that name existed earlier in the Legislative Assembly of the Province of Canada and the Legislative Assembly of Lower Canada).  Its final election was in 1927.  It disappeared in the 1931 election and its successor electoral districts were Gaspé-Nord and Gaspé-Sud.

It was re-created for the 1973 election by merging part of Gaspé-Nord with all of Gaspé-Sud, which both ceased to exist.

In the change from the 2001 to the 2011 electoral map, it gained all of La Haute-Gaspésie Regional County Municipality from the former Matane, namely the municipalities of Cap-Chat, La Martre, Marsoui, Mont-Saint-Pierre, Rivière-à-Claude, Sainte-Anne-des-Monts, Sainte-Madeleine-de-la-Rivière-Madeleine, Saint-Maxime-du-Mont-Louis and the unorganized territories of Coulée-des-Adolphe and Mont-Albert.

Linguistic demographics
Francophone: 91.3%
Anglophone: 8.4%
Allophone: 0.2%

Members of Legislative Assembly / National Assembly

Electoral results

|-
 
|Liberal
|Georges Mamelonet
|align="right"|8,947
|align="right"|56.25
|align="right"|+18.71

|-
|}

|-
 
|Liberal
|Georges Mamelonet
|align="right"|7,022
|align="right"|37.54
|align="right"|-4.72

|-
|}

|-
 
|Liberal
|Johnny Gérard
|align="right"|8,052
|align="right"|42.26
|align="right"|-2.44

|-

|-
|}

References

External links
Information
 Elections Quebec

Election results
 Election results (National Assembly)

Maps
 2011 map (PDF)
 2001 map (Flash)
2001–2011 changes (Flash)
1992–2001 changes (Flash)
 Electoral map of Gaspésie–Îles-de-la-Madeleine region
 Quebec electoral map, 2011

Gaspé, Quebec
Quebec provincial electoral districts